The Isyu Ngayon series (Issues Today) was a brand of regional news magazine shows of different GMA Regional TV stations in the Philippines. They were aired weekly in Dagupan, Cebu, Iloilo and Davao on Saturday mornings; and aired daily in Naga, Bacolod, Cagayan de Oro and General Santos. The Isyu Ngayon family of programs was not available in the Metro Manila market. Its editions in Naga, Iloilo, Bacolod and Davao were aired internationally via GMA News TV International.

Airing History
Isyu Ngayon premiered on October 30, 2010, as a Saturday morning news magazine program replacing the Agenda series of GMA Regional TV in Dagupan, Cebu, Iloilo and Davao, a special series of forums and documentaries for the 2010 national and local elections. The program was well known of being patterned with Sunday morning talk shows in the United States tackling political issues and human interest stories and was the network's answer to Mag TV Na. It was also launched on November 22, 2010, as a daily news magazine program following the launch of regional news and public affairs teams on their satellite stations in Naga, Bacolod, Cagayan de Oro and General Santos as an answer to the regional editions of TV Patrol in these areas.

However, its editions in Dagupan, Cebu, Iloilo and General Santos were cancelled during the last quarter of 2011 to first quarter of 2012 despite garnering good ratings, the three weekly editions were replaced by a travel show Let's Fiesta aired every Sunday while the operations of General Santos station was later on absorbed by the Davao station with Flash Bulletin as its solely produced program. Despite the cancellation of four editions, Isyu Ngayon remained in some areas.

With the plans of GMA to extend their Serbisyong Totoo and because of the outgrowing performance in the provinces, it led for two Isyu Ngayon to transform into live newscasts. On September 14, 2012, the Naga edition successfully ended following the launch of GMA Bicol originating station and was replaced by its flagship regional newscast Baretang Bikol, which later on became 24 Oras Bikol. Then it was followed on February 4, 2013, when the Cagayan de Oro edition was replaced by Testigo Northern Mindanao, which later on became 24 Oras Northern Mindanao following the launch of the GMA Northern Mindanao originating station.

On October 13, 2012, Isyu Mindanao was launched as consolidation for Cagayan de Oro, Davao and General Santos editions. Eventually it was replaced by Isyu ug Istorya on July 19, 2014.

The Bacolod edition, which was the only daily edition using the Isyu Ngayon brand, was aired side by side with Ratsada of GMA Iloilo and later stopped, this edition became the flagship news and public affairs program of GMA Bacolod. Unlike other GMA regional newscasts which were aired live from their respective studios, the program was taped on location except for covering local events when they were being broadcast live. The edition, however, was not included to the news programs of the network rebranded to 24 Oras. However, the program's episode for April 24, 2015, turned out to be their last episode after the network decided to strategically streamline its regional operations which led to the termination of some employees and talents and cancellation of other morning and afternoon programs as well as closing down other regional news departments in Ilocos, Bicol and Northern Mindanao on the same day, followed by Iloilo news department on November.

Segments
 Nangungunang Isyu - Story on the biggest ongoing event in the region with interviews with the biggest newsmaker in the locality.
 Developing Story - Features an ongoing topic that impacts the majority, for instance issue of livelihood, the environment, politics, and the economy.
 In na In - Features on technological breakthroughs, trends, and fashion.
 Anong Isyu Mo? - Man on the street interviews on different prevailing topics such as price hikes, use of contraceptives, service activities and the like.

List of Isyu Ngayon Editions (final composition)

Aired in weekly basis
 North Central Luzon Isyu Ngayon  (GMA Dagupan)
Delivered in Filipino - Hosted by Alfie Tulagan.
 Central Visayas Isyu Karon  (GMA Cebu)
Delivered in Cebuano - Hosted by Lou-Anne Mae Rondina.
 Ilonggo Isyu Subong (GMA Iloilo)
Delivered in Hiligaynon - Hosted by Fabienne Paderes and Enrico Surita, Jr.
 Isyu Mindanao (GMA Cagayan de Oro, GMA Davao and GMA General Santos)
Delivered in Cebuano - Hosted by John Paul Seniel and Jennifer Solis.

Aired in daily basis
 Negrense Isyu Subong  (GMA Bacolod)
Delivered in Hiligaynon - Hosted by Gretchen Varela-Ochoa.

Previous regional versions
 Bicolandia Isyu Ngonian  (GMA Bicol)
Delivered in Bicolano - Hosted by Elmer Caseles.
 Northern Mindanao Isyu Karon (GMA Cagayan de Oro) (fused into Isyu Mindanao)
Delivered in Cebuano - Hosted by Sylvia Aguhob.
 Southern Mindanao Isyu Karon  (GMA Davao) (fused into Isyu Mindanao)
Delivered in Cebuano - Hosted by John Paul Seniel and Helen Quiñanola.
 Soccsksargen Isyu Karon  (GMA General Santos) (fused into Isyu Mindanao)
Delivered in Cebuano - Hosted by Jennifer Solis.

Isyu Ngayon Areas

Luzon 
North Central Luzon Isyu Ngayon
Dagupan (station-produced)
Baguio
Mountain Province
Olongapo
Baler, Aurora

Bicolandia Isyu Ngonian
Naga (station-produced)
Legazpi
Sorsogon
Masbate
Virac

Visayas 
Ilonggo Isyu Subong
Kalibo
Roxas
Iloilo (station-produced)

Negrense Isyu Subong
Bacolod (station-produced)
Murcia, Negros Occidental

Central Visayas Isyu Karon
Dumaguete
Cebu (station-produced)
Bohol
Tacloban
Ormoc
Calbayog
Borongan

Mindanao 
Northern Mindanao Isyu Karon
Iligan
Ozamiz
Cagayan de Oro (station-produced)
Bukidnon
Dipolog
Pagadian

Southern Mindanao Isyu Karon
Davao (station-produced)

Soccksargen Isyu Karon
General Santos (station-produced)
Kidapawan
Cotabato

Note: Isyu Mindanao, the successor of the three Isyu Ngayon Mindanao editions, was produced by GMA Davao.

References 

2010 Philippine television series debuts
2015 Philippine television series endings
GMA Network news shows